Ming Dong Gu (born 1955) is a Chinese-born American literary scholar. He was born in Sheyang County, Yancheng, Jiangsu. He received his doctorate in Chinese and comparative literature from the University of Chicago and has taught at various U.S. colleges. He is a special consultant to the Criticism Norton Anthology of Theory and Criticism and an invited evaluator for the Academic Reputation Survey of the World University Rankings. His scholarly area of interests covers English literature, Chinese literature, comparative literature, comparative thought, and cross-cultural studies. He is currently professor of Chinese and comparative literature at the University of Texas at Dallas.

Books 
 2005 Chinese Theories of Reading and Writing: A Route to Hermeneutics and Open Poetics
 2006 Chinese Theories of Fiction: A Non-Western Narrative System
 2013 Sinologism: An Alternative to Orientalism and Post-colonialism
 2015 Translating China for Western Readers: Reflective, Critical, Practical Essays (Edited by Ming Dong Gu with Rainer Schulte)

References 

University of Chicago alumni
University of Texas at Dallas faculty
1955 births
Living people
People from Yancheng
Chinese emigrants to the United States